The Australasian Performing Right Association Awards of 2015 (generally known as APRA Awards) are a series of related awards which include the APRA Music Awards, Art Music Awards, and Screen Music Awards. The APRA Music Awards of 2015 was the 33rd annual ceremony by the Australasian Performing Right Association (APRA) and the Australasian Mechanical Copyright Owners Society (AMCOS) to award outstanding achievements in contemporary songwriting, composing and publishing. The ceremony was held on 24 March 2015 at the Carriageworks, Sydney. The host for the ceremony was Brian Nankervis, adjudicator on SBS-TV's RocKwiz.

The Art Music Awards were distributed on 11 August at the City Recital Hall, Sydney. These were provided by APRA, AMCOS and Australian Music Centre (AMC) to recognise "artistic achievement and excellence within the field of Australia's art music industry." The Screen Music Awards were issued on 13 November by APRA, AMCOS and Australian Guild of Screen Composers (AGSC), which "acknowledges excellence and innovation in the genre of screen composition".

On 26 February nominations for the APRA Music Awards were announced on multiple news sources, with Sheppard receiving four nominations; while Dan Sultan, Sia and Jesse Shatkin, and 5 Seconds of Summer received three each. A total of 13 awards were presented, with Fifa Riccobono honoured by the Ted Albert Award for Outstanding Services to Australian Music. Riccobono worked for Albert Music for 40 years. Sia was presented with Songwriter of the Year for the third consecutive year – the first artist to ever do so.

Presenters

At the APRA Music Awards ceremony on 24 March 2015, aside from the host, Brian Nankervis, the presenters were Jimmy Barnes, Vance Joy, Kerri-Anne Kennerley and Melinda Schneider.

Performances

The APRA Music Awards ceremony showcased performances by:
 Daniel Johns – "Preach"
 Lisa Mitchell and Jake Clemons
 Thief
 Penelope Austin and M-Phazes
 Jon Hume
 Mark Vincent and Julie Lea Goodwin
 Jimmy Barnes and Diesel
 Kingswood

APRA Music Awards

Blues & Roots Work of the Year

Breakthrough Songwriter of the Year

Country Work of the Year

Dance Work of the Year

International Work of the Year

Most Played Australian Work

Most Played Australia Work Overseas

Pop Work of the Year

Rock Work of the Year

Song of the Year

Songwriter of the Year

Sia (aka Sia Furler)

Ted Albert Award for Outstanding Services to Australian Music

Fifa Riccobono

Urban Work of the Year

Art Music Awards

Instrumental Work of the Year

Jazz Work of the Year

Orchestral Work of the Year

Vocal / Choral Work of the Year

Performance of the Year

Award for Excellence by an Individual

Award for Excellence by an Organisation

Award for Excellence in Music Education

Award for Excellence in a Regional Area

Award for Excellence in Experimental Music

Award for Excellence in Jazz

Distinguished Services to Australian Music

Screen Music Awards

Feature Film Score of the Year

Best Music for an Advertisement

Best Music for Children's Television

Best Music for a Documentary

Best Music for a Mini-Series or Telemovie

Best Music for a Short Film

Best Music for a Television Series or Serial

Best Original Song Composed for the Screen

Best Soundtrack Album

Best Television Theme

Most Performed Screen Composer – Australia

Most Performed Screen Composer – Overseas

References

2015 in Australian music
2015 music awards
APRA Awards